John Pratt may refer to:

John Pratt (judge) (1657–1725), Lord Chief Justice of England and interim Chancellor of the Exchequer
John Pratt (soldier) (1753–1824), United States Army officer
John Pratt, 1st Marquess Camden (1759–1840), British politician
John Pratt, 3rd Marquess Camden (1840–1872), British politician
John Pratt, 4th Marquess Camden (1872–1943), British peer
John Pratt (died 1835), hanged for sodomy
John Pratt (archdeacon of Calcutta) (1809–1871), British clergyman and mathematician, developer of the theory of isostasy
John Pratt (cricketer) (1834–1886), English cricketer
John Teele Pratt (1873–1927), American corporate attorney, philanthropist, music impresario, and financier
John Pratt (Liberal politician) (1873–1952), Scottish Liberal politician
John Lee Pratt (1879–1975), American businessman who served on GM's board of directors
John Pratt (Canadian politician) (1894–1973), Manitoban politician
John H. Pratt (1910–1995), US Court of Appeals judge
John Pratt (Provost of Southwell) (1913–1992), Anglican archdeacon and provost
John Winton or John Pratt (1931–2001), English naval officer, author and obituarist
John W. Pratt (born 1931), professor of statistics, economics, and business at Harvard University
John Pratt (footballer) (born 1948), English footballer
John Bridge Pratt (1833–1870), husband of Anna Bronson Alcott Pratt, the elder sister of novelist Louisa May Alcott
John M. Pratt (1886–1954), tax resistance leader, activist, publicist and newspaper man
John S. Pratt (1931–2020), American Army drum instructor
John Jonathon Pratt (1831–1905), American journalist and newspaper editor
John Pratt (archdeacon of St David's), Welsh Anglican priest

See also
John Pratt-Johnson (1929–2015), Canadian ophthalmologist
Robert John Pratt (1907–2003), Canadian architect, comedian, and politician
John Christopher Pratt (born 1935), Canadian artist
Jack Pratt (1878–1938), American film director
Jack Pratt (ice hockey) (1906–1988), Scottish hockey player